Guarea crispa is a species of plant in the family Meliaceae. It is endemic to Brazil.  It is threatened by habitat loss.

References

crispa
Flora of Brazil
Endangered plants
Taxonomy articles created by Polbot